Jarl Espen Ygranes (born January 23, 1979) is a former Norwegian professional ice hockey player.

Ygranes was drafted by the Montreal Canadiens in the ninth round (228th overall) in the 1997 NHL Entry Draft but never played in the NHL and remained in Norway throughout his professional career.  He played in the GET-ligaen for Furuset, Frisk Asker and Vålerenga.  He was also a member of the Norway national ice hockey team.

Career statistics

References

External links 

1979 births
Living people
London Knights players
Norwegian ice hockey defencemen
Montreal Canadiens draft picks
Ice hockey people from Oslo
Furuset Ishockey players
Frisk Asker Ishockey players
Vålerenga Ishockey players